Hypermail is a free program for creating email archives, in the form of cross-referenced HTML documents. It takes a file in Unix mbox format and generates an HTML archive, complete with an index and various sorting options. It is commonly used for creating mailing list archives, but it can archive any collection of emails. Originally written in 1994 by Tom Gruber using Common Lisp, it was rewritten in C by Kevin Hughes for its initial public release in 1994.

The mbox format is used by several email clients on various platforms, including most Unix and Linux ones. Popular examples of email clients that use the mbox format (and as such are compatible with Hypermail) include Kmail, pine and Mozilla Thunderbird.

Hypermail is operated at the command-line. It was originally intended for use in Unix-like platforms such as Linux. However, it is also possible to use the program in Microsoft Windows by compiling it with MinGW, or by using the Cygwin library.

Building for Windows

It is possible to compile Hypermail as a fully native Windows program by using MinGW. However, certain modifications need to be made to the program's source code. Building Hypermail for Windows using MinGW, by Israel G. Lugo, provides a patch to apply these modifications, as well as step by step instructions on how to accomplish the whole process and some usage examples.

Instructions are also available for creating the executable using Cygwin. Building HYPERMAIL on WIN32 with CYGWIN, by Bob Crispen, guides the user through the steps required, and offers a usage example as well.

See also

 Pipermail

References

External links
 Hypermail's homepage
 Hypermail's old homepage (archived June 2005)
 

Free email software